Oak Grove Lutheran School is a private, Lutheran school for students in pre-Kindergarten  through grade 12 in Fargo, North Dakota. It was founded in 1906. Oak Grove began as school that housed mostly Norwegian schoolgirls.

History
In March 2009, the permanent dike surrounding the school was breached by the Red River, causing the school to relocate operations for the remainder of the school year.

Athletics
Oak Grove competes in the North Dakota High School Activities Association. Oak Grove offers baseball, basketball, golf, track and field, and volleyball. In conjunction with other Fargo schools, it also offers softball, cross country, ice hockey, soccer, swimming and diving, tennis, wrestling, and gymnastics.

Fine arts
Oak Grove students begin participating in music programs in elementary school. Students participate in choirs K-12. Elementary students can perform in the choir squad alongside their general music classes. Starting in 5th grade, students can participate in school bands. Middle school has both a general choir and an auditioned honor choir, and high school specialty choirs include concert choir, chapel choir, madrigals, and carolers.

Activities
The Oak Grove Lutheran School chess team is open to anyone in grades 1-12 and is active in the fall, winter and spring. The speech team is active in the winter and spring and open to students in grades 7-12.

References

External links
Oak Grove Lutheran School website

Education in Fargo–Moorhead
Lutheran schools in North Dakota
Private high schools in North Dakota
North Dakota High School Activities Association (Class B)
North Dakota High School Activities Association (Class AA Football)
Educational institutions established in 1906
Schools in Cass County, North Dakota
Private elementary schools in North Dakota
Private middle schools in North Dakota
Buildings and structures in Fargo, North Dakota
1906 establishments in North Dakota